Mistel is a river of Bavaria, Germany. It is a left tributary of the Red Main in Bayreuth.

See also
List of rivers of Bavaria

References

Rivers of Bavaria
Bayreuth (district)
Bayreuth
Rivers of Germany